President Park may refer to:
 Park Chung-hee (1917–1979), 3rd president of South Korea
 Park Geun-hye (born 1952), impeached 11th president of South Korea and daughter of the 3rd president

See also
 Park (Korean surname)